The C30-7 is a 6-axle diesel-electric locomotive built by GE Transportation Systems between September 1976 and May 1986 as an updated U30C with a 16-cylinder  FDL-series diesel engine. 1,137 were built for North American railroads.

GE's successor to the C30-7 was the C36-7, early versions of which were quite similar to the C30-7.

Variants

C30-7A
A variant of the C30-7, 50 GE C30-7As were purchased by Conrail in mid-1984. Externally similar to the GE C30-7 model, six tall hood doors per side (in place of eight) showed it had a 12-cylinder (rather than 16-cylinder) prime mover. Both engines produced  but the C30-7A's smaller engine used less fuel. The C30-7A units were built between May and June 1984.

Chicago Freight Car Leasing Australia purchased twelve former Conrail C30-7A locomotives in 2001 and used their traction components in the rebuilding of 442 class locomotives as the GL class. These entered service in Australia from 2003.

In December 2018, Brazil’s only surviving C30-7A was restored in time for use on a holiday train.

Original owners

Use in Estonia 

In 2003 19 C30-7As were rebuilt and exported to Estonia as C30-7Ais to be used by EVR (Eesti Raudtee) which at that time was privately owned. The locos were numbered as part of Class 1500 (1558–1576) and were second-hand from Conrail/CSX/NS (USA).

In 2018, Operail (formerly EVR Cargo) announced it had completed its first conversion of the series with #1564.  International Railway Journal reported, "Only the frames and bogies of the original locomotive were retained and the C30-M features a new centrally-positioned driver’s cab and a 1.55MW Caterpillar 3512C HD diesel engine."  The converted unit has a 1520mm track gauge and weighs 138 tonnes.  Operail's redesign makes the units suitable for shunting and line haul.  The redesigned units are planned for internal use and export sales.

See also 
 Iranian locomotives

References

 
 
Diesel Era Volume 3 Number 3 May/June 1992 General Electric C30-7 by Warren Calloway pages 13-34.

External links
 

C30-7
C-C locomotives
Diesel-electric locomotives of the United States
Railway locomotives introduced in 1976
Freight locomotives
Standard gauge locomotives of the United States
Standard gauge locomotives of Mexico
5 ft gauge locomotives
Diesel-electric locomotives of Mexico